The Pavilion Theatre at 191–193 Whitechapel Road, London, was the first major theatre to open in London's East End. It was destroyed by fire in 1856 and rebuilt as the New Royal Pavilion Theatre, which operated until 1935.

History
The theatre was opened in 1827 on the site of a former factory, and was the first major theatre to open in London's East End. The first managers were William Wyatt and John Farrell.

A September performance review.

A December performance was to lead to a prosecution in January.

The advert on 4 January.

The management were taken to court for not having a licence.

The advert on 10 January.

'Alberti, or, the Mines of India by Elizabeth Polack was performed on 10 May 1834.
Another Polack play Esther the Royal Jewess, or the Death of Haman, with a story taken from the Old Testament, and considered in its time to be a type of an "Exotic East" melodrama, was successfully produced in 1835.

The first Pavilion Theatre was entirely destroyed by fire on 13 February 1856  It was rebuilt in 1858 as the New Royal Pavilion Theatre, with a capacity of 3,500. It was further reconstructed in 1871 by the architect J. T. Robinson, and the capacity increased to 4,000. Charles Dickens, Jr. (eldest child of Charles Dickens), in his 1879 book Dickens's Dictionary of London'', described the Pavilion this way: "A large East-end theatre capable of holding considerably over 3,000 persons. Melodrama of a rough type, farce, pantomime, &c."

In the early 20th century it became the home of Yiddish theatre, catering to the large Jewish population of the area, and gave birth to the Anglo-Jewish 'Whitechapel Boys' avant-garde literary and artistic movement.

In later years, it operated under the names, Royal Clarence Theatre, Eastern Opera House, and New Royal Pavilion Theatre, continuing in business until 1935. The building was demolished in 1962.

References

Theatres completed in 1828
Buildings and structures in Whitechapel
1828 establishments in England
1828 in London
1935 disestablishments in England
Buildings and structures demolished in 1962
Former theatres in London
Jewish English history